Abiko may refer to:

People
Abiko (surname)

Places
Abiko, Chiba, city in Chiba Prefecture, Japan
Abiko Station (Chiba), railway station in Abiko, Chiba Prefecture Japan
Abiko Station (Osaka), railway station in Sumiyoshi-ku, Osaka, Japan